Wilken is a surname.  Notable people with the surname include:

 Aud Wilken (born 1965), Danish singer
 Charles Wilken (1866–1956), Danish actor
 Claudia Ann Wilken (born 1949), United States federal judge
 Dorothy Wilken, American politician
 Friedrich Wilken (1777–1840), German librarian, historian and orientalist
 Hermann Wilken (1522–1603), German humanist and mathematician
 Patrick Wilken (born 1966), Australian scientist and editor
 Stewart Wilken (born 1966), South African serial killer

See also
 Wilkens
 Wilkin